Nelson Ndukwe Akwari (born February 4, 1982 in Houston, Texas) is a retired American soccer player. He began his career with the United States national team youth academy in Bradenton, Florida, and played for several professional clubs in various U.S. leagues.

Career

Youth and College
Akwari attended Strake Jesuit College Preparatory, a private school in Houston, before attending USSF's Bradenton Academy, where he trained with other Under-17 national teamers like Landon Donovan, DaMarcus Beasley, and Bobby Convey.

Although he considered turning pro, Akwari instead went to UCLA to play college soccer. He stayed at UCLA two years, starting every game as a freshman in 2000, and being named second-team All-Pac-10 as a sophomore.

He returned to UCLA after completion of his soccer career and earned Bachelors, Masters, and Doctorate degrees in Engineering.

Professional
Akwari left college after his sophomore year to pursue opportunities in Europe, but when nothing came of them, he signed a Project-40 contract with MLS late in the 2002 season. Akwari was put into a lottery, which the MetroStars won; Akwari appeared in seven games and was traded during the offseason to the Columbus Crew.  Akwari saw little playing time in 2003, appearing in 11 games but starting only five for the Crew, while spending a lot of time on loan to A-League's Cincinnati Riverhawks. In his third year in the league, Akwari began to show much more of the promise that he had as a youth national teamer - he took possession of the starting right back position midseason, and remained there for the rest of the year, ending the season with 16 starts as the Crew won the MLS Supporters' Shield.

After the 2004 season, Akwari was selected tenth overall by Real Salt Lake in the Expansion Draft, reuniting him with old coach John Ellinger. Akwari played 41 games over the 2005 and 2006 seasons.

Akwari signed for USL Second Division side Charlotte Eagles in April 2007, and scored on his debut against Crystal Palace Baltimore on April 20, 2007. He then signed for Charleston Battery in 2008, spending two seasons with the club including a run to the final of the 2008 US Open Cup.

Akwari signed on 26 January 2010 for the Canadian club Vancouver Whitecaps a one-year contract. He scored his first professional goal for Vancouver on April 29, 2010 in a game against the Portland Timbers.  On October 19, 2010, the Vancouver Whitecaps released Akwari. Akwari joined the expansion Los Angeles Blues in the USL Pro league for the 2011 season.

Akwari retired following the 2011 season and settled in Charleston, where he works as an engineer for Boeing and is a frequent commentator on Battery game broadcasts.  

He also finished 8th in his Fantasy Football League after winning it all in 2022.

International
Akwari has represented the United States at the U-17, U-20 and U-23 levels, playing at the 2001 U-20 World Youth Championship in Argentina, and the 1999 U-17 World Youth Championship in New Zealand.

References

External links
 Vancouver Whitecaps bio
 Charleston Battery bio
 

1982 births
Living people
American soccer players
Charlotte Eagles players
Charleston Battery players
Cincinnati Riverhawks players
Columbus Crew players
Expatriate soccer players in Canada
Association football defenders
Orange County SC players
Major League Soccer players
New York Red Bulls players
Soccer players from Houston
Strake Jesuit College Preparatory alumni
Real Salt Lake players
UCLA Bruins men's soccer players
A-League (1995–2004) players
USL First Division players
USL Championship players
USL Second Division players
Vancouver Whitecaps (1986–2010) players
USSF Division 2 Professional League players
United States men's youth international soccer players
United States men's under-20 international soccer players
United States men's under-23 international soccer players